The 2014 Emakumeen Euskal Bira was the 27th edition of the Emakumeen Bira, a women's cycling stage race in Spain. It was held from 12 to 15 June 2014 and was raced over four stages. It was rated by the UCI as category 2.1 event. French rider Pauline Ferrand-Prévot won the overall classification, as well as two stages.

Stages

Stage 1
12 June 2013 – Iurreta to Iurreta,

Stage 2
13 June 2013 – Oñati to Oñati,

Stage 3
14 June 2013 – Arrieta to Mungia,

Stage 4
15 June 2013 – Ataun to Ataun,

Classification progress

See also
 2014 in women's road cycling

References

External links

Emakumeen Euskal Bira
Emakumeen Euskal Bira
Emakumeen Euskal Bira